Josh Konieczny (born May 26, 1991) is an American competitive rower.

He competed at the 2016 Summer Olympics in Rio de Janeiro, in the men's lightweight double sculls.

References

1991 births
Living people
American male rowers
Olympic rowers of the United States
Rowers at the 2016 Summer Olympics
American people of Polish descent